Orson Welles is an impact crater in the Coprates quadrangle of Mars, located at 0.2° S and 45.9° W. It is 124.5 kilometers in diameter and was named after Orson Welles (1915–1985), an American radio and motion picture actor and director. He is famous for, among other things, his radio broadcast of The War of the Worlds by H. G. Wells in which Martians invade Earth. The layers and the clay minerals found in Orson Welles Crater are evidence that it once contained a lake.

See also 
 Impact crater
 Impact event
 Lakes on Mars
 List of craters on Mars
 Ore resources on Mars
 Planetary nomenclature

References 

Coprates quadrangle
Impact craters on Mars
Orson Welles